Robert Ingersoll Wilder (January 25, 1901 – August 22, 1974) was an American novelist, playwright and screenwriter.

Biography
Wilder was the son of a minister-turned-lawyer-turned-doctor-turned-dentist who was still going to college when his son was born. Wilder's childhood was spent at Daytona Beach, Florida. Following a stint in the U.S. Army during World War I, he was educated at Stetson University and Columbia University. At various times in his life, Mr. Wilder was a soda jerk, a ship fitter, a theater usher, a shipping clerk, a newspaper copyboy, leader of a criminal gang, "a publicity agent" (Claudette Colbert was among his clients), a radio executive, and a journalist (for The New York Sun).

Wilder traveled widely and contributed stories to The New Yorker, among other publications. Two of his plays were Sweet Chariot, based on the life and career of African-American activist Marcus Garvey, and Stardust, both produced on Broadway, at a time when Wilder was living in Bayside, New York.

Probably Wilder's best-known book is the novel Flamingo Road (1942). With his wife, Sally, he adapted it into the 1946 play of the same name. He then wrote the screenplay for the 1949 film version, starring Joan Crawford. He wrote one of the screenplays for the Western The Big Country (1958), directed by William Wyler. A later novel, Wind from the Carolinas, was first published in 1964.

Wilder died in August 1974. His papers are held at the Gottlieb Library at Boston University. For the early 1980s Flamingo Road TV series, Wilder was credited as its creator.

Works

God Has a Long Face (1940)
Flamingo Road (1942)
Out of the Blue (1943)
Mr. G. Strings Along (1944)
Written on the Wind (1946)
Bright Feather (1948)
Wait for Tomorrow (1950)
And Ride a Tiger (1951)
Autumn Thunder (1952)
The Wine of Youth (1955)
Walk With Evil (1957)
A Handful of Men (1960)
The Sun Is My Shadow (1960)
Plough the Sea (1961)
Wind from the Carolinas (1964)
Fruit of the Poppy (1965)
The Sea and the Stars (1967)
An Affair of Honor (1969)
The Sound of Drums and Cymbals (1973)

The following films were based on Wilder's work:

 Flamingo Road (a film and a TV series)
 Sol Madrid (Fruit of the Poppy)
 A Stranger in My Arms (And Ride a Tiger)
 Written on the Wind

References

External links
 

1901 births
1974 deaths
20th-century American novelists
American male screenwriters
Writers from Richmond, Virginia
People from Daytona Beach, Florida
Novelists from Florida
United States Army personnel of World War I
Stetson University alumni
Columbia University alumni
The New York Sun people
20th-century American dramatists and playwrights
American male novelists
American male dramatists and playwrights
Journalists from Virginia
20th-century American male writers
Novelists from New York (state)
Novelists from Virginia
20th-century American non-fiction writers
American male non-fiction writers
Screenwriters from New York (state)
Screenwriters from Virginia
Screenwriters from Florida
20th-century American screenwriters
20th-century American journalists
American male journalists